Leandro Luchese Guerreiro (born 17 November 1978 in São Borja) is a Brazilian footballer who played for América Mineiro as a defensive midfielder.

Honours
Criciúma
Campeonato Brasileiro Série C: 2006

Botafogo
Taça Rio: 2007, 2008, 2010
Taça Guanabara: 2009, 2010
Campeonato Carioca: 2010

Cruzeiro
Campeonato Mineiro: 2011
Campeonato Brasileiro Série A: 2013

References

External links
 canalbotafogo.com

 CBF

1978 births
Living people
Brazilian people of Italian descent
Sportspeople from Rio Grande do Sul
Brazilian footballers
Association football midfielders
Campeonato Brasileiro Série A players
Campeonato Brasileiro Série B players
Campeonato Brasileiro Série C players
Sport Club Internacional players
Guarani FC players
Associação Atlética Ponte Preta players
Criciúma Esporte Clube players
Botafogo de Futebol e Regatas players
Cruzeiro Esporte Clube players
América Futebol Clube (MG) players
Serie A players
Serie B players
U.S. Salernitana 1919 players
S.S.C. Napoli players
Delfino Pescara 1936 players
Brazilian expatriate footballers
Brazilian expatriate sportspeople in Italy
Expatriate footballers in Italy